Saehan (SMC) BL064 is a licensed built Isuzu Journey M series.

Description 

Saehan Motors reintroduced this micro bus series after a brief absence since taking over from GM Korea.  It continues to have the capacity of 25 passengers.  However, this bus series received larger Isuzu based 4BA1 engine series from its predecessor.  Production of this Micro Bus series ceased to be made after the government enacted “Automobile Industry Rationalization Policy.”  Only 945 units were made during its production run.

Paint Scheme 
The default color sold by the company was used at the Seoul area starting in 1977; white with orange horizontal stripes.  Other colors were also applied as green with midsection of beige up to near front of the rear wheel with twice alternating colors in oblique angle strip at the bus.  The remaining midsection part was matched to the body color.  By 1980, some of these buses were painted as white divided with marine blue at the top at the windows area and the bottom horizontal.

See also 
Saehan Motor Company (1976~1983)
Automotive industry in South Korea
Isuzu Journey
Isuzu B Engine
 새한 BL
 いすゞ・ジャーニー

References 

 기업연혁: 새한자동차
 연혁: 1970 ~ 1980년대

External links 

 서울시내버스 도색역사 (Seoul Paint Scheme starting 1977)
 대우버스 50년사 (1st picture of 3rd panel of this first bus rolled off the assembly line)
 GMK버스 Chevrolet BLD24, Chevrolet BD50DL 차종에 대하여 설명해주세요.[배기량, 엔진, 출력] (GMK (Chevrolet) BLD24 body dimension)

Buses
Isuzu vehicles
Minibuses